"Say It Right" is a song by Canadian singer Nelly Furtado from her third studio album, Loose (2006). It was written by Furtado, Tim "Timbaland" Mosley, and Nate "Danja" Hills, with Furtado crediting the Eurythmics' song "Here Comes the Rain Again" as her inspiration. The song was released as the third single from Loose on October 31, 2006 by Geffen Records and Mosley Music Group; in Europe, it was released as the fourth.

"Say It Right" attained worldwide success, topping the charts in the United States, France, New Zealand, and numerous European countries. The accompanying music video for the song, directed by Rankin & Chris, features Furtado singing in various locations. The song has been performed on a number of live appearances by Furtado, including her third headlining Get Loose Tour. It received a Grammy Award nomination for Best Female Pop Vocal Performance at the 50th Annual Grammy Awards (2008) but lost to Amy Winehouse's "Rehab".

Background and writing
The process of creating the song began in the recording studio one morning at around 4:00 a.m., when Timbaland recommended that Furtado should go home because she was tired. Furtado, who had heard that the band U2 (a band she says she deeply admires) wrote many of their songs in the studio control room, said "Really? I'll show you", put on her hoodie and began to "jam". Nate Hills and Timbaland soon joined her, writing and producing as they went, and according to Furtado, this process intensified as she sang. The team used four microphones in the live room and moved them around during recording, about which Furtado said, "...when you listen to it—there's a lot of dimension. It kind of sounds like [Timbaland is] in another country." Afterwards, they picked the best vocals and "perfected" them, before inserting "reverbs and weird alien sounds" onto them. "[W]e experimented a lot with depth and different sounds," Furtado said of the making of the song. "[It] affected my vocals a whole lot."

"Say It Right" is performed with a moderate techno groove and is written in F minor. It is set in common time; in 4/4 count. The chord progression is Fm–E♭–D♭–B♭m. Furtado's vocal range spans from Ab3 to F5. Furtado has cited the "spooky, keyboard-driven pop sound" of the band Eurythmics, particularly their 1983 song "Here Comes the Rain Again", as an influence on "Say It Right" and other tracks on Loose. "I'm not 100 percent sure what ["Here Comes the Rain Again" is] about, but it always takes me away to another place, and I love it", she said. The song focuses on mystic or transcendental experiences, as Furtado explained in a 2007 interview, "It is a kind of a magical song. It has a mystery to it, that I have not quite figured out. It has a haunting twist to it."

In other interviews Furtado said that she does not really know what "Say It Right" is about, "but it captures the feeling I had when I wrote it, and it taps into this other sphere." The song was played during the Miss Universe 2007 Introductory Ceremony, the 2006 American Music Awards, and Concert for Diana.

Critical reception
Billboard magazine called the song "a Pussycat Dolls-inspired contempo jam, high on hooks and of-the-moment production. Well done, if in the most generic sense." About.com's Bill Lamb gave the song 4/5 stars, saying that with "Say It Right", "many pop music fans are likely to take a second look at purchasing [Loose]". He described the song as "the foundation of Loose" and "a welcomed presence in the pop top 40". IGN Music calls the song "...one of the brightest moments on the album" and "another throwback to the '80s" which "...lets loose with the most hypnotic chorus". AllMusic's Stephen Thomas Erlewine considered the song "a dark meditative piece that would have fit on [Furtado's] previous records".

The New York Times described the song as "building a groove from hard drums and ghostly, multitracked voices, and Ms. Furtado sings a melancholy chorus she doesn't quite believe", comparing the coda, with music getting louder and then slowly fading, "the way the best — and worst — nights out often do". Also, DJ Z's reviewed the song as "the only single in the world to work at both a club in Manhattan, and on a safari through the natives land of (fill in the blank)." The song received a nomination for Best Female Pop Vocal Performance at the 50th Annual Grammy Awards, losing to Amy Winehouse's "Rehab". It was also nominated for two MuchMusic Video Awards.

Chart performance
In the United States, the song was made available for airplay at mainstream contemporary hit radio stations on October 30, 2006. Geffen Records withdrew from radio the second single from Loose, "Maneater", before promoting "Say It Right". The song debuted on the Billboard Bubbling Under Hot 100 Singles chart at number 22 on the issue dated 18 November. It entered the Billboard Hot 100 in late-November at number 93, and it reached number one in its fourteenth week on February 24, 2007, becoming Furtado's first and only number-one single and her 3rd and last top 10 hit with no features. The song stayed at number one for one week, in the top 10 for 14 weeks and on the Hot 100 for 30 weeks. "Say It Right" contributed to sales of the album Loose, and was credited as being responsible for its return to the top 10 on the U.S. Billboard 200. According to Nielsen Broadcast Data Systems, "Say It Right" was the second most-played song on U.S. radio in 2007 with 364,000 plays through December 2, and it was at number four on R&R magazine's 2007 year-end all-format top 100 songs list. On the Billboard Hot 100 year-end chart, it was ranked ninth. The RIAA certified "Say It Right" platinum in December 2007. "Say It Right" peaked at number one for 10 weeks on the Canadian BDS Airplay Chart, which it entered in early December, becoming Furtado's third Canadian number-one single. According to BDS, it was the fourth most-played song of 2007 on Canadian radio, amassing around 56,900 detections.

The song had equal success on Billboard's Canadian Hot 100; it reached number five on unpublished versions of the chart, and debuted when the chart was introduced the week of June 2, 2007. The song remained on the Canadian Hot 100 for over six months after the chart was officially introduced. "Say It Right" peaked at number two for three consecutive weeks on the Australian ARIA Singles Chart, giving Loose a "second wind" on the albums chart, according to the Herald Sun; ARIA accredited it as a platinum single. The single debuted at number 37 on the UK Singles Chart in February 2007, before reaching its peak; ten, a month later, and by doing so, it broke the record for the highest chart placing for a download-only single, after chart regulations were changed to allow songs not accompanied by a physical format to chart. Since then, the record was broken by the band Coldplay with their number-one hit "Viva la Vida". The popularity of "Say It Right" contributed to sales of Loose in the UK, according to Music Week, helping the album reach its highest chart position since its first week of release. The song was the twenty-ninth best-selling single of 2007 in the UK. The song also spent 37 weeks on the UK Singles Chart, twice as long as any other of Furtado's top-40 singles.

In France, the song debuted at number one with 8,100 copies sold on its release, becoming the lowest-selling number one in a week. In Germany, it debuted at number two, where it stayed for nine non-consecutive weeks, behind DJ Ötzi and Nik P.'s "Ein Stern (...der deinen Namen trägt)", which topped the German chart for several months. It became the third-most-successful song of 2007 in Germany. It was the most successful single of 2007 in the European Hit Radio. "Say It Right" is Nelly Furtado's most successful song in Australia, Austria, Romania,  Switzerland and Sweden. It is Furtado's second most successful single in Norway, the Netherlands, France (after "All Good Things (Come to an End)"). New Zealand (after "Turn Off the Light") and in the United States (after "Promiscuous").

Music video
The music video for "Say It Right" was directed by British duo Rankin & Chris and filmed in Los Angeles, California in late October 2006. It was shot back-to-back with the video for "All Good Things (Come to an End)", the album's third single in Europe. Furtado called the video her "first action thing" since the video for her 2000 single, "I'm Like a Bird", and said that it featured her experiencing what she called "a total rock-star moment. It's so iconic." The mini-feathered cocktail dress Furtado wears at the opening of the video was designed specifically for her by Australian designer Alex Perry, who said, "It's so cool because she's just undergone a bit of a revamp from what her previous image was; she's become a little more sexy and glamorous."

The clip starts with a helicopter landing on a black helipad, with Furtado's name on the building, with Furtado getting out. Throughout the video, she is shown on the roof of the building, with the Los Angeles skyline in the background. The video features mostly face shots of her and Timbaland interspersed with shots of dancers, under the careful guidance of internationally acclaimed Puerto Rican choreographer Gabriel Rivera.

Furtado described the clip as "a throwback to the '80s ... the more surreal side" because the shots of her and Timbaland reminded her of Annie Lennox and Dave Stewart in videos for Eurythmics' singles, and "the strange relationship [they] had, where ... you get this intense vibe from it. And Tim and me, we're partners, we vibe on a serious creative level, so the video captures that energy." The video ends with Furtado climbing back into the helicopter, which flies off.

The video debuted on MTV's Total Request Live in the U.S. on November 6 and on Canada's MuchMusic in the week ending November 16. It reached number nine on the Total Request Live top ten video countdown on November 8, its first day on the countdown; it returned to the countdown on December 14 and peaked at number one twice. The video reached number one on the MuchMusic series Countdown for the week ending February 16. The "Say It Right" video was retired from TRL after spending forty days on the countdown. At the 2007 MTV Video Music Awards, Furtado was nominated for Female Artist of the Year for "Say It Right" and "Maneater". "Say It Right" was nominated for the MuchMoreMusic Award for Best International Video by a Canadian category at the 2007 MuchMusic Video Awards. MTV International certified the "Say It Right" video platinum for more than 6,000 plays on the MTV network.

Remixes and covers
The official Spanish remix features Jayko. Dummies, Friscia & Lamboy, Menage Music, and Peter Rauhofer produced dance remixes of "Say It Right". Juan Martinez of Universal Music Group, the A&R person who enlisted the producers of the remixes for each single from Loose, said that the "Say It Right" remixes had received "the strongest reaction". South African Pop musician Nic Billington covered the song as a single back in 2007.  Bloc Party covered the song on Jo Whiley's radio show on April 11, 2007, and Marié Digby released a version on her YouTube channel in 2007.
Swedish heavy metal band Civil War covered "Say It Right" on their debut EP, Civil War, released November 13, 2012, on Spotify. Tame Impala covered the song on BBC Radio1's Annie Mac Show on November 11, 2020.

Track listings

 Australian CD single
 "Say It Right" (radio edit) – 3:34
 "Maneater" (Radio 1 Live Lounge session) – 3:00

 European CD single
 "Say It Right" (radio edit) – 3:34
 "What I Wanted" – 3:53

 European maxi-CD single
 "Say It Right" (radio edit) – 3:34
 "What I Wanted" – 3:53
 "Say It Right" (Peter Rauhofer remix part 1) – 8:33
 "Say It Right" (video)

 Digital download EP (Remixes)
 "Say It Right" (Peter Rauhofer remix part 1) – 8:33
 "Say It Right" (Menage Music remix) – 6:24
 "Say It Right" (Dummies club mix) – 7:24
 "Say It Right" (Friscia & Lamboy Electrotribe MixShow mix) – 9:49

Credits
Credits are adapted from the Loose liner notes.

Technical
 Recorded and mixed at: The Hit Factory Criteria, Miami, Florida

Personnel

 Nelly Furtado – lyrics, vocals, background vocals
 Timbaland – producer, music, drums, background vocals
 Danja – producer, music, keyboards
 Kevin Rudolf – guitar
 Jim Beanz – background vocals, vocal production
 Demacio "Demo" Castellon – recording, engineering, mixing
 Marcella "Ms. Lago" Araica – additional recording
 Ben Jost – second engineering
 James Roach – second engineering
 Kobla Tetey – second engineering
 Vadim Chislov – second engineering

Charts

Weekly charts

Year-end charts

Decade-end charts

Certifications

Release history

See also
 List of Billboard Hot 100 number-one singles of 2007
 List of European number-one hits of 2007
 List of number-one singles from the 2000s (New Zealand)
 List of number-one hits of 2007 (Switzerland)
 List of number-one dance singles of 2007 (U.S.)
 List of Romanian Top 100 number ones of the 2000s
 List of number-one hits of 2007 (France)

References

2006 songs
2006 singles
2007 singles
Nelly Furtado songs
Billboard Hot 100 number-one singles
SNEP Top Singles number-one singles
Number-one singles in France
Number-one singles in New Zealand
Number-one singles in Poland
Number-one singles in Romania
Number-one singles in Slovakia
Number-one singles in Spain
Number-one singles in Switzerland
Song recordings produced by Danja (record producer)
Song recordings produced by Timbaland
Songs written by Timbaland
Songs written by Danja (record producer)
Songs written by Nelly Furtado
Song recordings produced by Jim Beanz
Geffen Records singles
Mosley Music Group singles